Gansel is a German surname. It may refer to:

 Carsten Gansel (born 1955), German literary scholar
 Dennis Gansel (born 1973), German film director
 Jürgen Gansel (born 1974), German politician